This is a list of mountain passes in Switzerland. They are generally situated in the Jura Mountains or in the Swiss Alps.

Pass roads

Trails

Railway

See also
 List of highest road passes in Switzerland
 List of highest paved roads in Switzerland
 List of mountains of Switzerland

External links

 Map with all drivable passes in Switzerland

 
Passes, mountain
Switzerland
Mountain passes